Siphlonuridae, also known as the primitive minnow mayfly is a family of insects belonging to the order Ephemeroptera.

Taxonomy
The family is divided into the following genera:

 Genus: Edmundsius
 Genus: Parameletus
 Genus: Siphlonisca
 Genus: Siphlonurus

Family Overview
The labrum (upper lip) is not notched in the middle; the antennae are shorter than twice the width of the head; the maxillae on the underside of the head lack prominent rows of golden spines; the abdominal gills are rounded and similar to each other in structure; 3 long slender filaments at the end of the body are about equally long.

References

 
Mayflies
Insect families